A stopover is a break in a journey.

Stopover may also refer to:
 Stopover, Kentucky, United States, an unincorporated community
 The Stopover, a 2016 French film
 "Stopover" (The Professionals), an episode of the television series